Abdulhusein Meheraly Thariani (3 April 1905 – 30 December 1972) was a member of the first generation of formally trained architects in Pakistan. Amongst his most prominent works is the Baitul Mukarram (National Mosque of Bangladesh) in Dhaka, Bangladesh. His works can be seen in three cities in three countries: Mumbai, India; Karachi, Pakistan; and Dhaka, Bangladesh.

Background

Thariani was born in 1905 in Bombay in British India (now Mumbai, India) as the only child of Fatimabai and Meheraly Thariani. He attended the J. J. School of Art's Architecture department. He was married to Gulshan; amongst his children are the Pakistani architects Saleem Thariani and Azad Thariani. His grandson Kumail is also an architect. His daughter Sabira Merchant is an actress and etiquette trainer in India.

Career
His career spanned almost four decades from 1929 to the late 1960s. In the 1950s, he along with 10 other practising architects including two foreigners; M. A. Ahed, Tajuddin Bhamani, Minoo Mistry, Pir Mohammad, R. S. Rustomji, H. H. Khan, Mehdi Ali Mirza, Zahiruddn Khawaja, Bloomfield and Peter Powell, formed the Institute of Architects, Pakistan.

British India (pre-1947)
He established his own practice, Abdulhusein M. Thariani in Bombay in 1929. Amongst his works in the city is the Ambassador Hotel.

Pakistan (from 1947)
After the creation of Pakistan as an independent state in 1947, he moved to Karachi and joined M/s Hyderi Construction Company as its Managing Director. Under his direction the first textile mill of Pakistan, Valika Textile Mills, in S.I.T.E. was constructed. In the early 1950s he left the company to restart his own practice under the name of Thariani & Co.

Freedom Movement
Thariani was an active member of the independence movement. He was the editor of the Vatan (1942), a Gujarati language newspaper seeking to gain the support of the business community for the cause of Pakistan.

Poet
Besides practising as an architect, Thariani wrote poetry in Gujarati under the pen-name of Sabir. His collection of poems was translated into Urdu by the poet Josh Malihabadi, and published. One of his poems was included in the Gujrati syllabus at the University of Karachi.

Projects
In Mumbai
 Ambassador Hotel
In Karachi
 Habib Square (1956)
 Muhammadi House (commercial building)
In Bangladesh
 Sonali Bank Limited, Head Office, Motijheel Dhaka (former National Bank of Pakistan)
 Adamjee Court (former headquarters in East Pakistan of the Adamjee Group)
 Baitul Mukarram National Mosque 
 Dhaka Improvement Trust Building (RAJUK Bhaban)
 Rajshahi Cadet College (formerly Ayub Cadet College), Sardah, Rajshahi
 Mirzapur Cadet College (formerly Momenshahi Cadet College), Tangail 
 Jhenaidah Cadet College
Residence of Badal Ghosh (owner of Ajax Jute Mill) in Gulshan, Dhaka

References

1905 births
1972 deaths
Muhajir people
Pakistani architects
Artists from Mumbai
Khoja Ismailism
Pakistani people of Gujarati descent